Myosin-If is a protein that in humans is encoded by the MYO1F gene.

It is expressed mainly in the immune system and might be involved in cell adhesion and motility. It is a candidate gene for (among other things) nonsyndromic deafness.

References

Further reading